This is a list of dishes found in Argentine Cuisine.

Dishes

Appetizers/starters

Main dishes

Sauces

See also
 List of cuisines

References 

Lists of foods by nationality
Dishes